"Wild Horses" is a song by English recording artist Birdy. It was released as a digital download on 11 March 2016 in the United Kingdom, as the second single from her third studio album, Beautiful Lies (2016). The song was written by Birdy and John McDaid and produced by TMS and Phil Cook.

Music video
The music video for "Wild Horses" was directed by Francis Wallis and filmed at the Underwater Studio in Basildon, England. A dreamy, fantastical performance video, set in an underwater vision, it sees the singer transformed into an ethereal mermaid who encounters a deep sea diver. The video was premiered online on 11 March 2016.

Track listing

Charts

Release history

References

2016 singles
Birdy (singer) songs
Folk ballads
2015 songs
Song recordings produced by TMS (production team)
Warner Music Group singles
Songs written by Johnny McDaid
Songs written by Birdy (singer)
2010s ballads